Alpha-1-acid glycoprotein 1 is a protein that in humans is encoded by the ORM1 gene.

This gene encodes a key acute phase plasma protein.  Because of its increase due to acute inflammation, this protein is classified as an acute-phase reactant.  The specific function of this protein has not yet been determined; however, it may be involved in aspects of immunosuppression.

Interactions
ORM1 has been shown to interact with Plasminogen activator inhibitor-1.

See also
 Orosomucoid

References

Further reading

Lipocalins